Aşağı Göycəli (also, Göycəli, Gëydzhali, and Gadzhally) is a village and municipality in the Aghstafa District of Azerbaijan.  It has a population of 1,950.

References 

 

Populated places in Aghstafa District